The Men's madison at the 2012 UCI Track Cycling World Championships was held on April 8. 17 teams participated in the contest.

Medalists

Results
The race was held at 21:10.

References

2012 UCI Track Cycling World Championships
UCI Track Cycling World Championships – Men's madison